The 1998 NCAA Division I Women's Tennis Championships were the 17th annual championships to determine the national champions of NCAA Division I women's singles, doubles, and team collegiate tennis in the United States.

Florida defeated Duke in the team final, 5–1, to claim their third national title (and second in three years).

Host
This year's tournaments were hosted by the University of Notre Dame at the Courtney Tennis Center in South Bend, Indiana.

The men's and women's NCAA tennis championships would not be held jointly until 2006.

See also
NCAA Division II Tennis Championships (Men, Women)
NCAA Division III Tennis Championships (Men, Women)

References

External links
List of NCAA Women's Tennis Champions

NCAA Division I tennis championships
NCAA Division I Women's Tennis Championships
NCAA Division I Women's Tennis Championships
NCAA Division I Women's Tennis Championships